Kaies Zouaghi (born 19 December 1977) is a retired Tunisian football defender and later manager.

He is a brother of Chaker Zouaghi.

References

1977 births
Living people
People from Béja
Tunisian footballers
Tunisia international footballers
Olympique Béja players
Étoile Sportive du Sahel players
Khaleej FC players
Association football defenders
Tunisian Ligue Professionnelle 1 players
Tunisian expatriate footballers
Expatriate footballers in Saudi Arabia
Tunisian expatriate sportspeople in Saudi Arabia
Tunisian football managers
Olympique Béja managers
ES Hammam-Sousse managers
Damac FC managers
AS Gabès managers
Étoile Sportive du Sahel managers
Saudi First Division League managers
Expatriate football managers in Saudi Arabia